Antipayuta is a rural locality (a settlement) and the administrative center of Antipayuta Rural Settlement of Tasovsky District, Yamalo-Nenets Autonomous Okrug, Russia. The population is 2,685 as of 2017.

Climate
Antipayuta has a subarctic climate (Köppen climate classification Dfc) with cold, long winters and short, cool summers.

Transport 
Antipayuta has an airport. Yamal operates flights with the district center Tazovsky, as well with Nakhodka and Gyda. During the navigable period (mid-July to late September) there is a ferry line between Salekhard and Antipayuta every five days

References 

Rural localities in Yamalo-Nenets Autonomous Okrug